Ian MacDonald  (born 22 February 1968) is a South African former rugby union player.

Playing career
MacDonald made his debut for Transvaal in 1990 and played 145 matches for Transvaal/Golden Lions/Lions during his career. He was a member of the Transvaal team that won the Currie Cup in 1993.

MacDonald made his test debut for the Springboks against the New Zealand All Blacks on 15 Augustus 1992 at Ellis Park in Johannesburg. He played in six test matches for the Springboks and also played in twelve tour matches, scoring five tries.

Test history

Accolades
MacDonald was voted as one of the five Young Players of the Year for 1990, along with Andrew Aitken, Jannie Claassens, Bernard Fourie and Theo van Rensburg

See also
List of South Africa national rugby union players – Springbok no. 565

References

1968 births
Living people
Rugby union players from Pretoria
South African people of Scottish descent
South African rugby union players
South Africa international rugby union players
White South African people
Rugby union flankers
Golden Lions players
Bulls (rugby union) players